Alexandria is a city in Egypt.

Alexandria may also refer to:

Places

Australia 
 Alexandria, New South Wales
 Alexandria Station (Northern Territory)

Canada 
 Alexandria, British Columbia
 Alexandria First Nation, a community in North Cariboo region of British Columbia
 Alexandria, Ontario
Alexandria Aerodrome

Europe
 Alexandria, Romania
 Alexandria, West Dunbartonshire, Scotland
 Aleksandria (disambiguation), places in Poland and Bulgaria
 Oleksandriia (disambiguation), places in Ukraine

United States 
 Alexandria, Alabama
 Alexandria, Indiana
 Alexandria, Kentucky
 Alexandria, Louisiana
 Alexandria, Louisiana metropolitan area
 Alexandria, Missouri
 Alexandria, Minnesota
 Alexandria Township, Douglas County, Minnesota
 Alexandria, Nebraska
 Alexandria, New Hampshire
 Alexandria Township, New Jersey
 Alexandria, New York
 Alexandria Bay, New York
 Alexandria, Ohio, a village in Licking County
 Alexandria, Scioto County, Ohio, an unincorporated community
 West Alexandria, Ohio
 Alexandria, Pennsylvania
 Alexandria, South Dakota
 Alexandria, Tennessee
 Alexandria, Virginia
Alexandria Union Station, often referred to as simply Alexandria
 Alexandria County, formerly in the District of Columbia and later in Virginia

West and Central Asia

These are places named for, and sometimes founded by, Alexander the Great, arranged roughly west to east:

 Alexandria Troas, in the ancient Troad, Asia Minor, near modern Dalyan, Turkey
 Alexandria ad Latmum, in ancient Caria, probably near modern Karpuzlu, Turkey
 Alexandria ad Issum, in ancient Syria, near modern İskenderun, Turkey
 Iskandariya (Alexandria), in ancient Mesopotamia, modern Iraq
 Alexandria in Susiana, later Charax Spasinu, modern Iraq
 Alexandria Carmania, unknown location, Iran
 Alexandria in the Caucasus, modern Bagram, Afghanistan
 Alexandria Arachosia, modern Kandahar, Afghanistan
 Alexandria Ariana, possibly modern Herat, Afghanistan
 Alexandria in Opiania, modern Ghazni, Afghanistan.
 Alexandria Prophthasia, location unknown, in modern Afghanistan
 Alexandria on the Oxus, Bactria, in modern Afghanistan
 Alexandria in Margiana or Merv, Bactria, in modern Turkmenistan
 Alexandria Eschate, Fergana, modern Tajikistan
 Alexandria Bucephalous, modern Punjab, Pakistan
 Alexandria Nicaea, modern Nicaea, Punjab, Pakistan
 Alexandria on the Indus, possibly modern Uch, Pakistan
 Alexandria in Orietai, possibly near modern Bela, Pakistan
 Alexandria Hyphasis, modern East Punjab, India

Other
 Alexandria, Rio Grande do Norte, Brazil
 Alexandria Governorate, Egypt
 Alexandria, Jamaica
 Alexandria, Eastern Cape, South Africa
 Alexandria, Mpumalanga, South Africa

Art, entertainment, and media

Fictional entities and places 
 Alexandria, a heroic character in Worm (web serial)
 Alexandria, a character in Xenoblade Chronicles 3
 Alexandria,  in the game Dragon Quest VIII: Journey of the Cursed King
 Alexandria, in the PlayStation game Final Fantasy IX
 New Alexandria, a city in the Xbox 360 game Halo: Reach
 Alexandria, a community of survivors in The Walking Dead comic and TV series

Film
 Alexandria (film), a 2005 Indonesian film
 Alexandria... Why?, Alexandria Again and Forever and Alexandria... New York, films by Youssef Chahine

Literature
 Alexandria (novel), 2009 novel by Lindsey Davis
 The Alexandria Quartet a tetralogy by Lawrence Durrell

Music
 Alexandria (album), 1989 album by Adrian Borland
 OST Alexandria, a soundtrack album of the 2005 film

Sports clubs
 Al Ittihad Alexandria Club, an Egyptian football club
 Philippos Alexandreia F.C., a Greek football club

Other uses
 Alexandria (given name), people with the name Alexandria
 Alexandria (library software), library automation software
 Alexandria (schooner), a three-masted schooner
 Alexandria (typeface), a serif font typeface created by Hank Gillete
 Alexandria Airlines, an Egyptian airline 
 Alexandria false antechinus Pseudantechinus mimulus, a small carnivorous marsupial
 Alexandria toadlet Uperoleia orientalis, a species of frog
 Alexandria University, a public research university in Alexandria, Egypt

See also 
 
 
 Alejandría, Colombia
 Alessandria (disambiguation)
 Alexandra (disambiguation)
 Alexandreia, Greece
 Alexandria Airport (disambiguation)
 Alexandria Canal (disambiguation)
 Alexandria High School (disambiguation)
 Alexandria Station (disambiguation)